Pierino Albini (16 December 1885 – 12 March 1955) was an Italian racing cyclist. He won stage 4 of the 1910 Giro d'Italia.

References

External links
 

1885 births
1955 deaths
Italian male cyclists
Italian Giro d'Italia stage winners
Cyclists from the Metropolitan City of Milan
20th-century Italian people